The IEEE James L. Flanagan Speech and Audio Processing Award is a Technical Field Award presented by the IEEE for an outstanding contribution to the advancement of speech and/or audio signal processing.  It may be presented to an individual or a team of up to three people.  The award was established by the IEEE Board of Directors in 2002. The award is named after James L. Flanagan, who was a scientist from Bell Labs where he worked on acoustics for many years.

Recipients of this award receive a bronze medal, certificate and honorarium.

Recipients 
Source
 2021: David Nahamoo
 2020: Hynek Hermansky
 2019: Hermann Ney
 2018: Mari Ostendorf
 2017: Mark Y. Liberman
 2016: Takehiro Moriya
 2015: Steve Young
 2014: Biing-Hwang Juang
 2013: Victor Zue
 2012: James Baker and Janet M. Baker
 2011: Julia Hirschberg
 2010: Sadaoki Furui
 2009: John Makhoul
 2008: Raj Reddy
 2007: Allen Gersho
 2006: James D. Johnston
 2005: Frederick Jelinek
 2004: Kenneth N. Stevens
 2004: Gunnar Fant

References

External links 
 Information on the award at IEEE

James L. Flanagan Speech and Audio Processing Award
Speech processing